Danila Vassilieff (22 March 1958) was a Russian-born Australian painter and sculptor.  He has been called the "father of Australian modernism".

Life
Danila Ivanovich Vassilieff  (Данила Иванович Васильев) was born in 1897 at Kagalnitskaya, near Rostov-on-Don, Russia. His father was a Cossack and his mother Ukrainian.   He studied mechanical engineering at a technical school at Novocherkassk and at a military academy in Saint Petersburg. During World War I and the Russian Civil War, he served with a Don Cossack cavalry regiment. He was captured by the Red Army at Baku in April 1920, but escaped by motorbike and made his way to China via Armenia, Persia, India and Burma.  In May 1923 in Shanghai, he married Anisia Nicolaevna, a fellow refugee. They set out for Australia, arriving in Townsville, Queensland in July.

They bought a sugar-farm at Yuruga, located near Ingham. By 1928 he was working as a railway labourer at Mataranka, Northern Territory.  It was here that he began to paint, using a child's paint set.  In 1929 he separated from his wife, was naturalized and left Australia. He travelled to Paris and then on to Rio de Janeiro, Brazil, where in 1930 and 1931 he had his first formal studies in art, under Dimitri Ismailovitch, a specialist in Byzantine mosaics and frescoes. From 1932 to 1935 he worked and exhibited in the West Indies, South America, England, Spain and Portugal.

While living in England, his ideas of using traditional Russian decorative art in a modernist context began to form.  This was helped by his friendship with Vladimir Polunin, at that time a teacher at the Slade School of Fine Art but previously a scene painter for Sergei Diaghilev's Ballets Russes. Vassilieff wanted to return to Russia, but Stalin's repressive regime made that impossible.

In 1935, when he decided to return from England to Australia, he stored over 50 paintings with his friends the Ogilvies near Bristol. By the outbreak of WWII in 1939 they were in the Ogilvies' attic. With the risk of incendiary bombs, the authorities insisted that most should be burnt – a number were kept hanging in the Ogilvies' home.

In October 1935, Vassilieff settled in Sydney. He painted inner-city street scenes, still lifes, portraits and landscapes, and exhibited twice at the Macquarie Galleries.

In 1937, he took up with Helen Macdonald, moving to Biloela, Queensland, and then to Melbourne, Victoria. There, his reputation gradually grew.  His paintings were often of children playing in the streets of inner suburban Melbourne. Vassilieff mixed in Melbourne's local Russian émigré and artistic circles, and joined the Contemporary Art Society.  He was befriended by people of the Heide Circle such as George Bell, Vance and Nettie Palmer, John and Sunday Reed, Arthur Boyd and John Perceval. His style began to influence younger artists such as Albert Tucker, Lina Bryans, Joy Hester, Charles Blackman and Sidney Nolan.  This group of artists came to be known collectively as the Angry Penguins, and Vassilieff is now considered their father figure.

In 1939, he became foundation art teacher at the experimental Koornong School, Warrandyte, operated by Clive and Janet Nield. His lover, Helen Macdonald, was a music teacher there. Nearby, he built a house of stone and logs that he named "Stonygrad". That home became a focal point for the Angry Penguins, as well as other local artists. His most supportive critic at that time was Basil Burdett, who was killed in an aircraft crash in 1942, soon after Germany invaded Russia.

In 1944, Vassilieff's relationship with Helen Macdonald ended.  He decided to sell Stonygrad and move to South Africa, but he fell in love with the purchaser, Elizabeth Orme Hamill, née Sutton, a 31-year-old lecturer and a divorcee.  Following a belated divorce from his first wife Anisia, he married Hamill in 1947.

Around this time, sculpture began to figure prominently in his output. He quarried Lilydale marble himself, and used power tools for his rough work, but gave his pieces a brilliant finish.  In 1953, he became vice-president of the Contemporary Art Society. He and Elizabeth separated in 1954, and he went to Mildura High School as an art teacher, transferring to Swan Hill the following year. He was a keen fisherman and regularly shared this hobby with the Swan Hill High School principal, Fred Wells. He continued to exhibit at the Gallery of Contemporary Art, Melbourne, in 1956 and 1957, but his work was either strongly criticised or not noticed at all. He was transferred to Eltham by the Victorian Education Department, but was sacked for unsatisfactory performance. He returned to Mildura, living in a shack and painting watercolours.

In 1958, aged 60, he died of heart failure while on a visit to "Heide", John and Sunday Reed's property at Bulleen (now the Heide Museum of Modern Art). There was a memorial exhibition in 1959, for which Albert Tucker wrote:

Danila Vassilieff's work is now represented in major Australian galleries.

https://www.academia.edu/46935079/THE_ART_AND_MESSED_UP_POLITICS_OF_DANILA_IVANOVICH_VASSILIEFF

Works

 At land’s end
 The buffet
 Children in the Street, gouache
 Children Playing in Collingwood School
 Coconut grove (West Indies), oil, signed D. VASSILIEFF 1933, private collection in England
 Dance Girl, gouache
 Drowned sisters
 Expulsion from Paradise, four-part screen (this was long believed lost, but was rediscovered and purchased in 1983 by the National Gallery of Australia
 Fairytale study pair – Shipwreck and sea things
 Fantasia Series (23) Fairytale, watercolour and gouache
 Firebird from Drummoyne
 Fitzroy Life
 Fitzroy street scene
 The Floral Dress, gouache
 Girl on the street
 Gossip (West Indies, probably Haiti), oil, signed D.I.V. H-1933, private collection in England
 Grey Smith, portrait
 Helen
 Helen Wearing a Red Hat, gouache
 Herbert Collingwood, portrait
 Ian Loder, portrait
 John Loder, portrait
 Junction
 Lawrence and Doris Ogilvie dancing (in their home The Dingle, East Dundry, Bristol, England), pencil and watercolour, signed DIV 1934, private collection in England
 Little woman
 Local celebrity
 Mechanical Man, sculpture
 Nameless carving
 Nocturne No. 3, Commonwealth Lane
 Out at sea
 Peter and the Wolf, gouaches
 Petit Bourgeois, sculpture
 The politician
 Portrait of a Woman, gouache
 Production Line Worker, Ordnance Factory, gouache
 Pupil III, Koornang School, gouache
 Railway,
 Red Roses, still life
 Soap Box Derby
 St George and the Dragon, gouache
 Stenka Razin, sculpture
 Street in Surry Hills (Self-Portrait in Cathedral Street)
 Street Scene with Graffiti
 Sunday and Sweeney Reed
 Sunken Wreck
 Three Children
 Two Crows, watercolour and gouache
 Two Leaning Together, gouache
 Unknown Political Prisoner II
 Untitled (two boys and dog)
 Visitor III, gouache
 Warrandyte Bushman, gouache
 Watching the parade I,  II
 Woman in Profile, gouache
 Woronora landscape
 Young girl (Shirley)

References

1897 births
1958 deaths
20th-century Russian painters
Russian male painters
20th-century Russian sculptors
20th-century Russian male artists
Russian male sculptors
Heide Circle
Australian painters
20th-century Australian sculptors
Emigrants from the Russian Empire to Australia
Soviet emigrants to Australia
White Russian emigrants to Australia